Marcantonio Chiarini (c. 1652–1730) was an Italian painter of the late-Baroque period. Born near Bologna, he trained with Francesco Quaino and Domenico Santi. He painted scenography for plays as well as quadratura in which Sigismondo Caula inserted figures. Active in Bologna and Milan, he also painted the quadratura of the Palazzo Mansi in Lucca, for which Giovanni Gioseffo dal Sole painted the main frescoes. Chiarini was employed by the architect Johann Lukas von Hildebrandt in the fresco decoration of the upper and lower Belvedere palaces near Vienna, work shared with  Martino Altomonte, Gaetano Fanti, and Carlo Carlone.

References

1650s births
1730 deaths
17th-century Italian painters
Italian male painters
18th-century Italian painters
Painters from Bologna
Italian Baroque painters
Quadratura painters
18th-century Italian male artists